The gymnastics competitions at the 2022 Gymnasiade were held from May 14 to 22, 2022 in Normandy, France.

Medal winners

Artistic gymnastics

Rhythmic gymnastics

Medal table

See also 
 Gymnastics at the 2013 Gymnasiade
 Gymnastics at the 2018 Gymnasiade

References 

Gymnasiade
2022 Gymnasiade
2022 Gymnasiade